is a 1952 Japanese film directed by Kiyoshi Saeki. It was entered into the 1952 Cannes Film Festival.

Cast
 Kyōko Kagawa (as K. Kagawa)
 Yaeko Mizutani (as Y. Mizutani)
 Yōichi Numata (as Y. Numata)

References

External links

1952 films
1950s Japanese-language films
Japanese black-and-white films
Toei Company films
Japanese war films
1952 war films
1950s Japanese films